Dusmareb District is a district in the central Galguduud region of Galmudug state of Somalia. Its capital lies at Dusmareb. Dusmareb is the administrative capital of Galmudug state and the Galguduud region. It is primarily inhabited by Somalis from the Hiraab sub-clan of the Hawiye, particularly the Ceyr sub-clan of Habar Gidir Hawiye.

A roadside bombing attributed to al-Shabaab killed 13 security forces in Dusmareb on February 6, 2021, shortly after a breakdown in talks about the 2021 Somali presidential election were announced.

References

External links
 Districts of Somalia
 Administrative map of Dusmareb District

Districts of Somalia

Galguduud